Ramiro Moyano (born 28 May 1990, in Tucumán, Argentina) is an Argentine rugby union player who plays for the national Argentina team The Pumas and most recently at club level for Edinburgh Rugby in the United Rugby Championship. Moyano mostly plays as a full-back but has on occasions played wing.

Having played for his local club Lince RC from a young age, he was selected for the Argentina U-19's team in 2009 before going on to represent Argentina U-20's in competitive tournaments in 2010. He represented the Pumitas in their home Junior World Championship playing in three games; Australia, England and France. He quickly moved on to the sevens circuit, playing in 16 competitions, including the 2013 Rugby World Cup Sevens in Moscow.

Between 2012 and 2014 he represented the Argentina Jaguars in the IRB Nations and Tbilisi Cup, where he helped the Jaguars to runner-up in the 2012 IRB Nations Cup and champions in the 2014 IRB Tbilisi Cup. Moyano was part of the Pampas XV side that won the 2011 Vodacom Cup beating the Blue Bulls 14–9. He was also part of the Pampas XV side that won back to back World Rugby Pacific Challenge titles in 2014 and 2015.

In 2011 he made his international senior debut, coming of the bench and scoring a try in Argentina's 61–6 win over Chile. The following week he gained his first start, starting at full-back against Uruguay. He continued to represent Argentina in the South American Rugby Championship while still playing sevens, and it wasn't until  2014 where he was called up to the Argentine side that would face a Tier 1 opposition - being named in a 33-man squad for their two-test series against Ireland - though did not make an appearance during the series.

In 2015, he was named in the inaugural Argentine Super Rugby team the Jaguares, where his first appearance came on 2 April 2016, in a 16–24 defeat to the Blues.

On 11 June 2016, he came of the bench against Italy in Argentina's 30–24 victory. This was Moyano's first cap for Argentina outside the South American Rugby Championship.

Moyano joined French club Toulon for the 2019-20 season.

References

External links
 UAR Profile
 

Pampas XV players
Jaguares (Super Rugby) players
Rugby union fullbacks
Argentine rugby union players
Argentina international rugby union players
1990 births
Sportspeople from San Miguel de Tucumán
Living people
Pan American Games medalists in rugby sevens
Pan American Games silver medalists for Argentina
Rugby sevens players at the 2011 Pan American Games
Medalists at the 2011 Pan American Games
RC Toulonnais players
Edinburgh Rugby players
American Raptors players